The  Arizona Rattlers season was the 17th season for the franchise. The Rattlers finished the regular season 8–8, and made the playoffs as the 3rd seed in the American Conference. They were eliminated from the playoffs in the Wild Card round, losing to the Grand Rapids Rampage, 41–48.

Standings

Regular season schedule

Playoff schedule

Staff

Final roster

Stats

Regular season

Week 1: at Utah Blaze

Week 2: vs. Los Angeles Avengers

Week 3: at San Jose SaberCats

Week 4: vs. New York Dragons

Week 5: at Chicago Rush

Week 6
Bye Week

Week 7: at Tampa Bay Storm

Week 8: vs. New Orleans VooDoo

Week 9: vs. Georgia Force

Week 10: at Los Angeles Avengers

Week 11: vs. San Jose SaberCats

Week 12: at Dallas Desperados

Week 13: vs. Grand Rapids Rampage

Week 14: at Orlando Predators

Week 15: at Kansas City Brigade

Week 16: vs. Colorado Crush

Week 17: vs. Utah Blaze

Playoffs

American Conference Wild Card: vs. (6) Grand Rapids Rampage

References

Arizona Rattlers
Arizona Rattlers seasons
Arizona Rattlers
2000s in Phoenix, Arizona